Biggleswade Rugby Club is a rugby union team from Bedfordshire.

English rugby union teams
Rugby union in Bedfordshire
Biggleswade